HM Prison Ashfield (formerly Pucklechurch Remand Centre) is an adult male sex offenders prison located in the village of Pucklechurch (near Bristol), in South Gloucestershire, England. The prison is operated by Serco.

Ashfield Prison was built on the site of the Pucklechurch Remand Centre, and opened in 1999. It was the first private prison in the United Kingdom to house young offenders. The prison was soon mired in controversy after repeated riots and reports of poor management. Conditions at the prison became so bad in 2003 that the Youth Justice Board withdrew prisoners from Ashfield, and threatened to recommend that the prison should be taken over by the public sector. Conditions improved however, and the prison (under new management) was given a good inspection report the following year.

In May 2006, staff at Ashfield won a Health team award from the 'Public Servants of the Year Awards'. The award was in recognition of the staff's dedication to improving healthcare and personal health education for inmates held at Ashfield.

In March 2008, a new wing for first-time offenders was opened at Ashfield. The wing is specifically designed to create a positive environment for new inmates, and also has amenities for prisoners aged 15 and 16.

In 2013 an inspection report that concluded offenders were "exposed to unacceptable levels of violence", including bones broken after the use of force by staff. Ashfield was converted to an adult male prison for sex offenders since July 2013 and a Treatment site since 2014.

Pucklechurch Remand Centre
From 1962 the Pucklechurch Remand Centre was built on the site of the former RAF Pucklechurch, opening in 1965 and expanded in 1978. The remand centre was destroyed in a riot in 1990.

Notable former inmates

 Rosemary West
 Stephen Fry (as former prison HMP Pucklechurch)
 Martin Berry

References

External links
 Ministry of Justice pages on HMP Ashfield 
 Serco pages on HMP Ashfield
 HMP Ashfield - HM Inspectorate of Prisons Reports

Ashfield
Ashfield
1999 establishments in England
Ashfield
Ashfield
Ashfield